Citra is an unincorporated community in Marion County, Florida, United States. The community is part of the Ocala Metropolitan Statistical Area. Citra is known as the home of the pineapple orange, (originally called the Hickory orange) a name coined in 1883 for an orange (fruit) with an aroma reminiscent of the pineapple.

History
Citra was founded in 1881 in a citrus-growing district. A post office has been in operation at Citra since 1881.

Citra has two buildings on the National Register of Historic Places: The Citra Methodist Episcopal Church and the Armstrong House. It is home to a University of Florida Institute of Food and Agricultural Sciences plant research facility, being expanded with a donation from Canadian billionaire Frank Stronach.

It is in the part of Florida immortalized in the writings of Marjorie Kinnan Rawlings  who lived nearby at Cross Creek.

Geography

Notable person
Popular tenor James Melton grew up in Citra.

See also

References

External links

 Marion County City and Towns

Unincorporated communities in Marion County, Florida
Unincorporated communities in Florida
Former municipalities in Florida